Sichuan First City is a defunct Chinese football club, which was located in Chengdu, Sichuan where they played in the Chengdu Sports Centre. They were founded in 1953 and spent a large part of their history within the top tier of Chinese football until on November 8, 1993 they became a fully professional unit and took part in China's inaugural season of professional football in the 1994 Chinese Jia-A League season. After being the flagship of western Chinese football the club was sold to the Dahe Group in 2002, however the new owners were found to be under the influence of another Chinese football team Dalian Shide. Despite the sale of the club to the First City Group in 2003, an investigation by the Chinese Football Association found them to still be breaking competition rules, and on January 27, 2006 the club were unable to sell the club's remaining Dalian Shide's shares to the Sichuan Football Association and were forced to disband.

History
Formed as Sichuan Quanxing (四川全兴) on 8 November 1993, the football club was the football flagship of western China until Qianwei Huandao (now Chongqing Lifan) surfaced. In 2002, Sichuan Quanxing was sold to Dahe Group and was renamed Sichuan Dahe.

However, the Dahe Group was found under the influence of Dalian Shide. Under the criticism of unfair competition, the team was sold again to the First City Group, renamed Sichuan First City and finished 9th in the 2004 and 2005 seasons. The sale had not removed the doubt of Dalian Shide influence, however.  After an investigation by Chinese Football Association, the club was ordered to remove any relationship with Dalian Shide.  The club disbanded on January 27, 2006 because the owner Dalian Shide could not make a deal with the Sichuan Football Association in time.

Name history
 1953–1993: Sichuan 四川
 1994–2001: Sichuan Quanxing F.C. 四川全兴
 2002: Sichuan Dahe F.C. 四川大河
 2003–2005: Sichuan First City F.C. 四川冠城

Crest history

Managerial history
Managers who coached the club and team since Sichuan First City became a professional club in 1993.
  Milos Hrstic (1998)
  Chi Shangbin (1998)
  Edson Tavares (1999)
  Milos Hrstic (2000)
  Bob Houghton (2001)
  Xu Hong (2003–2004)
  Gao Huichen (2004–2005)

Results
All-time league rankings

 No league games in 1959, 1966–72, 1975; Sichuan did not compete in 1985.
: In the group stage.
: in the southern league.

References

External links
Profile at sina.com

Defunct football clubs in China
Association football clubs established in 1993
Association football clubs disestablished in 2006
Football clubs in China
1993 establishments in China
2006 disestablishments in China